José "Chechu" Biriukov Aguirregaviria (born 3 February 1963) is a retired Spanish-Soviet professional basketball player. He was born in Moscow to a Russian father and a mother of Basque origin. Biriukov began playing basketball for Dynamo Moscow basketball team, before moving to Spain at the age of 20 to play for Real Madrid. He played a total of 11 seasons in Real Madrid, 22 games in the USSR national team and 67 for the Spain men's national basketball team.

He played as shooting guard and was a good three points shooter, using a particular style of shooting the ball flat to the basket. One of his most famous international games was playing the 1988 McDonald's Open against Boston Celtics.

Career achievements

Club titles
International

European League: 1 (with Real Madrid: 1994–95)
European Cup Winners' Cup: 2 (with Real Madrid: 1988–89, 1991–92)
Korać Cup: 1 (with Real Madrid: 1987–88)

Domestic

Spanish League: 4 (with Real Madrid: 1984–85, 1985–86, 1992–93, 1993–94)
Spanish Cup: 4 (with Real Madrid: 1984–85, 1985–86, 1988–89, 1992–93)
Spanish Supercup: 1 (with Real Madrid: 1985)

References

1963 births
Living people
Basketball players at the 1988 Summer Olympics
Basketball players at the 1992 Summer Olympics
BC Dynamo Moscow players
Liga ACB players
Olympic basketball players of Spain
Real Madrid Baloncesto players
Russian expatriate basketball people in Spain
Russian people of Basque descent
Russian people of Spanish descent
Small forwards
Soviet men's basketball players
Soviet people of Spanish descent
Spanish men's basketball players
Spanish people of Russian descent